The 1927 Central State Bearcats football team represented Central State Teachers College, later renamed Central Michigan University, in the Michigan Collegiate Conference (MCC) during the 1927 college football season. In their fifth season under head coach Wallace Parker, the Bearcats compiled a 7–1 record (2–1 against MCC opponents), shut out four of eight opponents, and outscored all opponents by a combined total of 124 to 37. The team lost to its in-state rival Michigan State Normal (0–6).

Schedule

References

Central Michigan
Central Michigan Chippewas football seasons
Central Michigan Bearcats football